The Black Corsair is an 1898 adventure novel written by Italian novelist Emilio Salgari.

The Black Corsair may also refer to:
 The Black Corsair (1937 film), a 1937 Italian adventure film directed by Amleto Palermi
 The Black Corsair (1976 film), a 1976 Italian adventure film based on Emilio Salgari's novels
 El corsario negro, a 1944 Mexican film

See also
The Black Pirate, a 1926 silent film